Moen may refer to:

People
 Moen (surname), a list of people with the surname "Moen"

Places

Belgium
, a village in the municipality of Zwevegem in West Flanders

Denmark
Moen, the anglicized spelling of Møn, an island in southeastern Denmark

Micronesia
Weno (formerly Moen), the main island of Chuuk and of the Truk Lagoon

Norway
Moen, Agder, a village in Risør municipality in Agder county
Moen, Troms, a village in Målselv municipality in Troms og Finnmark county

Other
Moen Incorporated, a producer of faucets and fixtures

See also

 
 Moe (disambiguation)
 Mo (disambiguation)